Antonyia Parvanova (born 26 April 1962, in Dobrich) is a Bulgarian politician who served as a Member of the European Parliament in 2007 and from 2009 until 2014. She is a member of the National Movement Simeon II, part of the Alliance of Liberals and Democrats for Europe.

Political career
Parvanova became a Member of the European Parliament on 1 January 2007 with the accession of Bulgaria to the European Union. During her time in parliament, she served on the Committee on the Environment, Public Health and Food Safety (2007, 2009–2014) and the Committee on Women's Rights and Gender Equality (2009–2014).

In addition to her committee assignments, Parvanova was part of the parliament's delegations for relations with Canada and to the Parliamentary Assembly of the Union for the Mediterranean from 2009 until 2014.

References

External links
European Parliament profile
European Parliament official photo

1962 births
Living people
Bulgarian women in politics
National Movement for Stability and Progress MEPs
MEPs for Bulgaria 2007
MEPs for Bulgaria 2009–2014
Women MEPs for Bulgaria